Aleksey Khovrin (born June 10, 1973) is a retired male freestyle swimmer from Kazakhstan. He competed at the 1996 Summer Olympics in Atlanta, Georgia, where he was disqualified with the Men's 4 × 100 m Freestyle Relay Team, alongside Sergey Borisenko, Sergey Ushkalov, and Aleksey Yegorov.

Achievements
Master of Sport of International Class
Master of Sport of USSR
Champion of Asian Games 1994
Champion of Kazakhstan
World Cup Silver Medal Holder
1996 Champion of USSR 1986
2006 CIS Games Silver and Bronze Medal Holder
Kazakhstan National Swimming Team.
2010 Champion of Russian in Masters Swimming
Masters Swimming Russia records holder
 autumn cup champion
Interview with Alexey on 28 May 2008

References

External links
 
 https://web.archive.org/web/20140503195756/http://swimmasters.ru/main/meets/records/
 https://web.archive.org/web/20140416182230/http://www.almontazah.ru/, http://www.almontazah.ae
 http://www.time.kz/news/archive/2008/05/29/4903

1973 births
Living people
Kazakhstani male freestyle swimmers
Olympic swimmers of Kazakhstan
Swimmers at the 1996 Summer Olympics
Asian Games medalists in swimming
Asian Games gold medalists for Kazakhstan
Asian Games silver medalists for Kazakhstan
Swimmers at the 1994 Asian Games
Medalists at the 1994 Asian Games
Kazakhstani people of Russian descent
20th-century Kazakhstani people